Blazing Guns may refer to:
 Blazing Guns (1943 film), an American Western film directed by Robert Emmett Tansey
 Blazing Guns (1935 film), an American Western film directed by Ray Heinz